Euchionodes is a genus of moths in the family Gelechiidae. It contains the species Euchionodes traditionis, which is found in Argentina.

References

Gelechiinae